Phosphorus is a genus of longhorn beetles of the subfamily Lamiinae, containing the following species:

 Phosphorus virescens (Olivier, 1795)
 Phosphorus unicolor Aurivillius, 1913

References

Tragocephalini
Cerambycidae genera